Salesi Finau (born 5 May 1973) is a Tongan former rugby footballer. He represented Tonga in both the rugby league and rugby union sides.

Background
Finau in Neiafu, Vava'u, Tonga.

Rugby league career
Salesi began his career with the Canberra Raiders, and played in the Tonga national rugby league team at the 1995 World Cup. After impressing during the tournament he signed for Warrington Wolves in the Super League,

Rugby union career

Club
In late 1998 Finau signed for Welsh rugby union side Llanelli Scarlets under coach Gareth Jenkins. Finau made 203 appearances for the side over the next six-year, becoming an instrumental team player, playing in 3 European Cup semi-finals and 2 Celtic League Titles, before ending his contract by mutual consent in September 2005. He then signed for Bath Rugby under John Connolly, spending a season at the West Country club before moving to French side Bourgoin. Finau had a successful season at Bourgoin, and on completion announced that he had signed a 2-year contract for Cornish Pirates. However, in June 2007, the club announced that they had agreed to release Finau from the deal when a family illness obliged him to return to his native Tonga.

Country
Finau received at least 13 caps for the Tongan national rugby union side, and played in the Tongan rugby sevens side at the 2002 Commonwealth Games.

TV career

Salesi currently presents a cooking show on Television Tonga called 'Salsa with Salesi'.

References

People from Vavaʻu
Canberra Raiders players
Tongan rugby league players
Warrington Wolves players
Tonga national rugby league team players
1973 births
Living people
Tongan rugby union players
Tonga international rugby union players
Dual-code rugby internationals
Tongan expatriate rugby union players
Expatriate rugby union players in England
Expatriate rugby union players in Wales
Tongan expatriate sportspeople in England
Tongan expatriate sportspeople in Wales